Wharton Place is a historic home located at Mappsville, Accomack County, Virginia. It was built in 1798, and is a two-story, five-bay, brick dwelling in the Federal style. It has a one-story brick kitchen wing. It has a deck-on-hip roof and projecting interior chimneys.  Also on the property is a contributing frame smokehouse. The house was built by John Wharton (1762-1811), a prosperous maritime merchant and native of Accomack County.

It was added to the National Register of Historic Places in 1974.

References

External links
Wharton Place, Assawaman Creek vicinity, Mappsville, Accomack County, VA: 2 photos and 2 data pages at Historic American Buildings Survey

Historic American Buildings Survey in Virginia
Houses on the National Register of Historic Places in Virginia
Federal architecture in Virginia
Houses completed in 1798
National Register of Historic Places in Accomack County, Virginia
Houses in Accomack County, Virginia
1798 establishments in Virginia